Sepia Search is a video search engine for PeerTube. It is developed by the French association Framasoft.

Overview 
Sepia Search was launched in September 2020, by the Framasoft association, to serve as a single portal to search for video on hundreds of PeerTube instances.

However, according to the association, this portal is not intended to be exhaustive or to centralise research on all bodies:

Timeline 
The instance search capacity of the Sepia Search portal has grown from around 500 PeerTube instances in September 2020 to almost 800 instances listed in March 2021.

Operation 
For any keyword, the service returns results found on all the federated instances. 

For a more specific query, it is possible to apply a sorting according to: 1) the date of publication, 2) the video duration or 3) by filtering contents considered sensitive. 

The look and feel of this portal is therefore deliberately similar to that of other video platforms for the general public such as Dailymotion, YouTube or Youku.

This service is based on two complementary elements:
 a search engine (the Sepia Search source code is hosted by framagit and is accessible to all);
 a JavaScript software, serving as a presentation interface for the page (search bar, processing of the request and results display, specifying the name of the instance to which the user goes when he or she clicks on "see this video").

See also 

 Fediverse — a federation of decentralised services to which PeerTube belongs
 Mastodon — leading microblogging software using ActivityPub, interoperable with PeerTube
 Dailymotion
 Vimeo
 Youku
 Social Web

References

External links 
 
 Instances — by Framasoft
 Serveur de démonstration
 Statistiques du réseau PeerTube — vu de Framasoft
 Statistiques du réseau PeerTube — vu de the-federation.info

Crowdfunding projects
Web applications
Peer-to-peer
Video hosting
Peer-to-peer charities
Streaming media systems
Streaming software
Streaming